Neolarra is a genus of cuckoo bees in the family Apidae. There are about 16 described species in Neolarra, all from North America.

Description
Smaller than a grain of rice, these bees lay eggs in the nests of Perdita bees; the Neolarra egg hatches and the larva eats the egg and food store intended for a Perdita larva. It enters while the host bee is gone to avoid detection.

Species
These 16 species belong to the genus Neolarra:

 Neolarra alba Cockerell, 1916 i c g
 Neolarra alexanderi Griswold & Parker, 1999 i c g
 Neolarra batrae Shanks, 1978 i c g
 Neolarra californica Michener, 1939 i c g b
 Neolarra clavigera Shanks, 1978 i c g
 Neolarra cockerelli (Crawford, 1916) i c g
 Neolarra hurdi Shanks, 1978 i c g
 Neolarra linsleyi Michener, 1939 i c g
 Neolarra orbiculata Shanks, 1978 i c g
 Neolarra penicula Shanks, 1978 i c g
 Neolarra pruinosa Ashmead, 1890 i c g
 Neolarra rozeni Shanks, 1978 i c g
 Neolarra ute Griswold & Parker, 1999 i c g
 Neolarra vandykei Michener, 1939 i c g
 Neolarra verbesinae (Cockerell, 1895) i c g b
 Neolarra vigilans (Cockerell, 1895) i c g b

Data sources: i = ITIS, c = Catalogue of Life, g = GBIF, b = Bugguide.net

References

Further reading

External links

 

Nomadinae
Articles created by Qbugbot